Listrocerum joveri is a species of beetle in the family Cerambycidae. It was described by Quentin in 1951, originally under the genus Combesius. It is known from the Ivory Coast.

References

Endemic fauna of Ivory Coast
Dorcaschematini
Beetles described in 1951